Posey Township is one of six townships in Switzerland County, Indiana, United States. As of the 2010 census, its population was 1,779 and it contained 955 housing units.

History
The Merit-Tandy Farmstead was listed on the National Register of Historic Places in 1977.

Geography

Cities, towns, villages
 Patriot

Unincorporated towns
 Antioch at 
 Gurley Corner at 
 Quercus Grove at 
 Searcy Crossroads at 
(This list is based on USGS data and may include former settlements.)

Adjacent townships
 Randolph Township, Ohio County (north)
 York Township (southwest)
 Cotton Township (west)

Cemeteries
The township contains these ten cemeteries: Antioch, Bark Works, Concord, Eastview, Grant Brothers, Jack, McNutt, Mead, Munger and Wigal.

School districts
 Switzerland County School Corporation

Political districts
 Indiana's 9th congressional district
 State House District 68
 State Senate District 45

References
 United States Census Bureau 2008 TIGER/Line Shapefiles
 United States Board on Geographic Names (GNIS)
 IndianaMap

External links
 Indiana Township Association
 United Township Association of Indiana

Townships in Switzerland County, Indiana
Townships in Indiana